Astalor is a small Afrotropical genus of potter wasps containing two species.

References

Potter wasps